The Hirnant Limestone is an old name for a geologic formation in England and Wales, defining the Hirnantian. It preserves fossils dating back to the Ordovician period. It is now classified as the Hirnant Limestone Member of the Foel Y Ddinas Mudstones Formation.

See also 
 List of fossiliferous stratigraphic units in Wales

References

Further reading 

 J. T. Temple. 1965. Upper Ordovician-Brachiopods from Poland and Britain. Acta Paleontologica Polonica 10:379-450
 
 

Geologic formations of Wales
Ordovician System of Europe
Ordovician Wales
 
Limestone formations
Ordovician southern paleotemperate deposits
Paleontology in England
Paleontology in Wales